Mohamed Jamoussi (born July 12, 1910 in Sfax and died on January 3, 1982) was a Tunisian singer, composer, and poet.

Career
Jamoussi became the artistic director of the Opéra d'Alger from 1948 to 1951.

Discography 

 Ala Allah (على الله)
 Ala chatt ennil (على شط النيل)
 Ala jalek sahert ellil (على جالك سهرت الليل)
 Ala khaddek (محلى خدك)
 Allah maàana (الله معانا)
 Almaktoub (اما لمكتوب)
 Asl ezzine (أصل الزين)
 Balek tensani (بالك تنساني)
 Cavallero (كافالييرو)
 Chaàlou leftila (شعلوا لفتيلة)
 Chouay chouay (شوية شوية)
 Ekouini (إكويني)
 El azoul (العزول)
 El fen el fen (الفن الفن)
 Elli omrou ma chaf ezzine (اللي ما عمرو شاف الزين)
 En kan nassibi (إن كان نصيبي)
 Ennessa (النساء)
 Essamra (السمراء)
 Ezzargua (الزرقاء)
 Fatma (فاطمة)
 Fatma wa hmada (فاطمة وحمادة)
 Fi ouyoun el bedouiya (في عيون البدوية)
 Fi ouyounek nar (في عيونك نار)
 Galbi elli khdhitih (قلبي اللي خذيتيه)
 Ghanni chwaya (غني شوية)
 Ghanni ya asfour (غني يا عصفور)
 Hajina wjina (حجينا وجينا)
 Hbiba ya hbiba (حبيبة يا حبيبة)
 Hlioua hlioua (حلوة حلوة)
 Hobbi ya nar (حبي يا نار)
 Houriya (حورية)
 Houriya jaya mel janna (حورية جاية من الجنة)
 Ih walla lala (إيه ولا لالا)
 Jamal ellil (جمال الليل)
 Jana ellil (جانا الليل)
 Kahouaji (قهواجي)
 Kelmet enhebbek chouya (كلمة نحبك شويا)
 Khalli nchouf hnaya (خلي نشوف هنايا)
 Khatoua khatoua (خطوة خطوة)
 Ki jitina (كي جيتينا)
 Koumi ya arbiya (قومي يا عربية)
 Lamouni li ghamouni menni (لاموني اللي غاروا مني)
 Lahn elwoujoud (لحن الوجود)
 Lamma choft elkoun b'aini (لما شفت الكون بعيني)
 Lemmima (لميمة)
 Ma bin essamra wel bidha (ما بين السمرا والببضة)
 Maaloum (معلوم)
 Maàraftech ya soud el ain (ما عرفتش يا سود العين)
 Mahla foshet ellil (محلى فسحة الليل)
 Mambou (مامبو)
 Manich sakran (مانيشي سكران)
 Nhebbou nhebbou (نحبو نحبو)
 Nouhi w'nini (نوحي وأنيني)
 Orgossi wghanni (ارقصي وغني)
 Rihet leblad (ريحة لبلاد)
 Saadi saadi b'bent el am (سعدي سعدي ببنت العم)
 Sanet eydik (صنعة ايدك)
 Sbaya w'zin (صبايا وزين)
 Siri al fajr (سيري ع الفجر)
 Temchi bessalama (تمشي بالسلامة)
 Teroui el atchan mayet zaghouan (تروي العطشان مية زغوان)
 Wahda wahda (وحدة وحدة)
 Weld elbedouia (ولد البدوية)
 Winek ya ghali (وينك يا غالي)
 Winou asfouri (وينو عصفوري)
 Ya azizati taali (يا عزيزتي تعالي)
 Ya flouket lebrour (يا فلوكة لبرور)
 Ya hbibi fi ghiyabi (يا حبيبي في غيابي)
 Ya heloua ya samra (يا حلوة يا سمرا)
 Ya mohamed ehna shabek (يا محمد احنا اصحابك)
 Ya om el kamis (يا ام القميص)
 Ya rit ennass (يا ريت الناس)
 Yfarrejha el maoula (يفرجها المولى)

References

External links 

1910 births
1982 deaths
People from Sfax
20th-century Tunisian male singers
Tunisian composers
20th-century Tunisian poets
20th-century composers